Etuko (or Etuku) is a village in Cameroon located in the Department of Manyu in the Southwest Region.

Demographics

The locality had 414 inhabitants in 1953, then 578 in 1967. At that date it had a market, a cooperative (CPMS), a Catholic school founded in 1959. During the 2005 census, there were 656 people.

See also
Communes of Cameroon

References

Populated places in Southwest Region (Cameroon)